Verner Lička (often written as Werner) (born 15 September 1954 in Hlučín) is a Czech football player and later manager. He played for Czechoslovakia, for which he played 9 matches and scored 1 goal.

Career
In his country he played for Baník Ostrava. At the end of his career he played abroad for clubs including FC Grenoble and Germinal Ekeren.

Personal life
Lička is of German ancestry. He has two football playing sons Mario and Marcel.

International goals
Scores and results list. Czechoslovakia's goal tally first.

References

External links
 
 Werner Licka's website

1954 births
Living people
People from Hlučín
Czech people of German descent
Czech footballers
Czechoslovak footballers
Czechoslovak football managers
Czech football managers
Footballers at the 1980 Summer Olympics
Olympic footballers of Czechoslovakia
Olympic gold medalists for Czechoslovakia
FC Baník Ostrava players
SFC Opava players
K. Berchem Sport players
Grenoble Foot 38 players
Ligue 2 players
UEFA Euro 1980 players
Czechoslovakia international footballers
Czech First League managers
FC Baník Ostrava managers
Górnik Zabrze managers
Calais RUFC players
Qatar SC managers
Wisła Kraków managers
Polonia Warsaw managers
Olympic medalists in football
Expatriate football managers in Poland
Czech expatriate sportspeople in Poland
Czechoslovak expatriate footballers
Expatriate footballers in France
Expatriate footballers in Belgium
Czechoslovak expatriate sportspeople in France
Czechoslovak expatriate sportspeople in Belgium
Czech expatriate sportspeople in Qatar
FC Fastav Zlín managers
Dyskobolia Grodzisk Wielkopolski managers
Medalists at the 1980 Summer Olympics
Association football forwards
Sportspeople from the Moravian-Silesian Region